Thomas Haynes was a member of the Virginia House of Burgesses, the elected lower house of the colonial Virginia General Assembly, from Warwick County, from 1736 to 1740.

Notes

References

 Stanard, William G. and Mary Newton Stanard. The Virginia Colonial Register. Albany, NY: Joel Munsell's Sons Publishers, 1902. , Retrieved July 15, 2011.
 Tyler, Lyon Gardiner, ed. 'Encyclopedia of Virginia Biography'. Volume 1. New York, Lewis Historical Publishing Company, 1915. . Retrieved February 16, 2013.

People from Warwick County, Virginia
Virginia colonial people
House of Burgesses members